The 1950–51 Montreal Canadiens season was the 42nd in franchise history. The team placed third in the regular season to qualify for the playoffs. The Canadiens lost in Stanley Cup final against Toronto Maple Leafs 4 games to 1. The five games were decided in overtime.

Regular season

Final standings

Record vs. opponents

Schedule and results

Playoffs
The Canadiens first played the Detroit Red Wings in the semi-finals. The first four games of the series was won by the visiting team. The Canadiens then won the last two to win the series four games to two to advance to the final against Toronto.

Stanley Cup Finals

The Canadiens lost to the Toronto Maple Leafs four games to one.

Player statistics

Regular season
Scoring

Goaltending

Playoffs
Scoring

Goaltending

Awards and records

Transactions

See also
 1950–51 NHL season

References

External links
Canadiens on Hockey Database
Canadiens on NHL Reference

Montreal Canadiens seasons
Montreal Canadiens season, 1950-51
Mon
2